The American Annals of the Deaf is a peer-reviewed academic journal published quarterly with one annual reference issue. The journal is published by Gallaudet University Press in Washington, D.C. It was first established in 1847 as the American Annals of the Deaf and Dumb. The journal's name was changed in 1886 upon the printing of volume 31, issue 4. The journal has been published continuously since its inception, with the exception of a seven-year interruption from 1861 to 1868 due to the American Civil War.

The journal is "the official organ of the Council of American Instructors of the Deaf (CAID) and the Conference of Educational Administrators of Schools and Programs for the Deaf (CEASD)."

Editors

References

External links 
 
 American Annals of the Deaf archive in the Washington Research Library Consortium digital library, contains volume 1, issue 1 to volume 38, issue 4 (maintained by the Gallaudet University Archives and Deaf Collections department)
 Kincheloe, Pamela. "Depictions of Printing in Deaf Periodicals." 4 April 2016. American Printing History Association. Accessed 3 April 2018.

Deaf studies journals
Publications established in 1847
Quarterly journals
English-language journals
1847 establishments in the United States